On the Rocks was a British television comedy that aired in 1969. Produced by Tyne Tees Television, it was about a fictional television station.

All eight episodes are believed to be lost.

References

External links

1969 British television series debuts
1969 British television series endings
Lost television shows
English-language television shows
ITV sitcoms
1960s British sitcoms
Black-and-white British television shows
Television shows produced by Tyne Tees Television